Theotokos of Novi Kodaky or Theotokos Samarska is a Christian Orthodox icon that has been venerated by the Zaporozhian Cossacks of the Dnieper Ukraine on April 24.   
 
The icon appeared in the village of Novi Kodaky, 7 versts north-west of Yekaterinoslav, at some point in the 18th century. Its origin is believed to lie in the Orient. By the mid-1760s, the icon, then kept in the local church of St. Nicholas, attracted crowds of pilgrims, including high-placed officers and generals. Nowadays it is the centerpiece of the Trinity Cathedral in Dnipropetrovsk.

References

Samarska
Ukrainian icons
History of Dnipropetrovsk Oblast